Ana Gloria Osorio Peña (born 12 April 1987) is a Salvadoran former professional tennis player.

Osório, who attained the number one ranking in her country, represented El Salvador in seven Fed Cup ties across 2001 and 2002. She featured only as a doubles player, winning six of her seven rubbers. In 2002 she helped El Salvador gain promotion to the American Zone Group I for the first time.

At the 2002 Central American and Caribbean Games she won two medals for El Salvador, in front of a home crowd in San Salvador. She was a bronze medalist partnering Liz Cruz in the women's doubles and won a further bronze medal in the team event, with Cruz and Marcela Rodezno.

ITF finals

Doubles: 1 (0–1)

References

External links
 
 
 

1987 births
Living people
Salvadoran female tennis players
Sportspeople from San Salvador
Competitors at the 2002 Central American and Caribbean Games
Central American and Caribbean Games medalists in tennis
Central American and Caribbean Games bronze medalists for El Salvador
21st-century Salvadoran women